"Hand in Hand" is a 1996 song by German band Dune, released as the second single from the group's second album, Expedicion (1996). The vocals is by Verena von Strenge and the song was a notable hit in Europe, peaking at number seven in the Netherlands and number ten in Germany. Additionally, it reached number 18 in Switzerland and number 39 in Austria. The song also charted in Scotland and the UK, reaching number 86 and 77.

Music video
A music video was produced to promote the single, directed by Swedish-based director Matt Broadley. It references the Pied Piper of Hamelin.

Track listing
 CD single, Germany (1996)
"Hand in Hand" (Video Mix) – 3:45
"Rainbow to the Stars" (Jam & Spoon Remix) – 7:32

 CD maxi, Germany (1996)
"Hand in Hand" (Video Mix) – 3:45
"Hand in Hand" (Head On Head) – 5:29
"Hand in Hand" (12" Mix) – 5:09
"Hand in Hand" (Jimmy Miller Remix) – 4:52

Charts

Weekly charts

Year-end charts

References

 

1996 singles
1996 songs
Dune (band) songs
English-language German songs
Music videos directed by Matt Broadley
Songs written by Oliver Froning